A Maid of the Silver Sea may refer to:

  A Maid of the Silver Sea (novel), a 1910 work by John Oxenham
  A Maid of the Silver Sea (film), a 1922 film adaptation directed by Guy Newall